"It's a Good Day" is a popular song written by Peggy Lee and her husband Dave Barbour and published in 1946. Peggy Lee's recording reached the Billboard charts in January, 1947 peaking at No. 16.

Other Recordings
The song has been recorded by many singers since its introduction.

Peggy Lee dueted the song with Bing Crosby on four occasions on Crosby's Philco Radio Time show in 1946/47 and Crosby sang it solo on the June 11, 1947 program. This version was included in the album "Swingin' with Bing! Bing Crosby's Lost Radio Performances".
Perry Como also sang this classic.

References

1946 songs
Capitol Records singles
Perry Como songs
Songs written by Peggy Lee
Songs written by Dave Barbour